Sekule is a village and municipality in Senica District in the Trnava Region of western Slovakia.

Etymology
The name is derived from the ethnonym Székelys, one of the tribes who guarded the frontier area.

History
In historical records the village was first mentioned in 1402.

Geography
The municipality lies at an altitude of 153 metres and covers an area of 23.492 km². It has a population of about 1,633 people.

References

External links

 Official page

Villages and municipalities in Senica District